Lordington House is a manor house near Walderton in West Sussex. It is a Grade II* listed building.

History
Lordington House was built around 1500. It was acquired by Sir Geoffrey Pole in the 16th century, by Hugh Speke in 1609 and then by Sir John Fenner in 1623. It was then bought by Phillip Jermyn in 1630, by Richard Peckham in around 1689 and by Richard Peckham (Peckham's great nephew) in 1718. After Peckham's death in 1734 it passed to his sister, Sarah, who married Thomas Phipps in 1742. It passed to her son Thomas Peckham Phipps, who died unmarried, and then to the Phipps Hornby family. The house was modified and extended by Admiral of the Fleet Sir Geoffrey Hornby who died there in March 1895.  It was sold to Sir Michael Hamilton in 1960 and now operates as a bed and breakfast facility under the management of the Hamilton family.

References

Country houses in West Sussex
Grade II* listed buildings in West Sussex